1994 Empress's Cup Final was the 16th final of the Empress's Cup competition. The final was played at Nishigaoka Soccer Stadium in Tokyo on March 26, 1995. Prima Ham FC Kunoichi won the championship.

Overview
Prima Ham FC Kunoichi won their 1st title, by defeating Nikko Securities Dream Ladies 4–1.

Match details

See also
1994 Empress's Cup

References

Empress's Cup
1994 in Japanese women's football